HNoMS Ula, previously HMS Varne, a British-built U-class submarine, and a member of the third group of that class to be built. She never actually served under the name Varne, being transferred before commissioning to the exiled Royal Norwegian Navy as HNoMS Ula (S300). In 1944 she sank a German U-boat during one of her patrols off Norway. She remained in Norwegian service and was scrapped in 1965.

Service history
Originally built for Royal Navy as Varne, it was planned that the Royal Dutch Navy should man her and name her Haai. The Dutch crew (mainly 34 from the decommissioned submarines KIX, KX and KXII) needed to be brought to the UK from Sydney via Cape Town. Their ship from Cape Town was the merchant vessel , which was unescorted and was attacked and sunk in the Atlantic, 48.30N 28.50W, by the German U Boat Type VIIc  on the night of 29 October 1942.

Varne was transferred to the Royal Norwegian Navy as HNoMS Ula (P66) in 1943, remaining there for the remainder of her career. She carried out 14 patrols during World War II, operating as part of the 'Norwegian Section' of the 9th Submarine Flotilla at Dundee. The target was the German Type VIIc U-boat  at about  range. One torpedo hit its target just behind the conning tower and the U-boat was blown in two and sunk, though eight crew survived.

This was the most notable of Ulas victims during her 14 patrols. She sank several other targets, mostly merchant ships, during her war service, all of which was spent on the Norwegian patrol.

Ula was the Allied submarine which sunk the most enemy tonnage in the Atlantic in the Second World War.

Ula continued in Norwegian service until 1965, when she was broken up in Hamburg.

References

Ships built in Barrow-in-Furness
1943 ships
World War II submarines of the United Kingdom
British U-class submarines of the Royal Norwegian Navy
World War II submarines of Norway